Anastasio Cocco (29 August 1799, Messina – 26 February 1854, Messina) was an Italian naturalist who specialized in marine biology.

Cocco was a pharmacist. He was especially interested in fish and described several taxa from the Straits of Messina. In 1852 his friend the German scientist Eduard Rüppell named a fish Microichthys coccoi to honor his name. He was a friend and correspondent of many other naturalists notably Charles Lucien Bonaparte, Antoine Risso and August David Krohn.

Works
Partial list
 Cocco, A. 1829. Su di alcuni pesci de'mari di Messina. Giornale di Scienze, Lettere ed Arti per la Sicilia (Palermo) 7 26(77): 138–147 [146]. Contains the description of Argyropelecus hemigymnus Cocco, 1829 the Halfnaked Hatchetfish.
Cocco, A. 1838. Su di alcuni Salmonidi del mare di Messina; lettera al Ch. D. Carle Luciano Bonaparte. Nuovi Annali delle Scienze Naturali. Bologna 1(2): 161–194 pls 5–8 [167, pl. 5(2)] Contains the description of Power's Deep-water Lightfish (Cocco, 1838).
with Rüppell, E. 1844.  Intorno ad alcuni cefalopodi del mare di Messina: lettera del Dr. Eduardo Rüppell di Frankfort sul Meno al Prof. Anastasio Cocco.  Giornale del Gabinetto Letteràrio di Messina, 5(27-28):129-135, 2 figures.

See also
:Category:Taxa named by Anastasio Cocco

Italian zoologists
1799 births
1854 deaths
Scientists from Messina
Italian pharmacists